Augustyn Dziedzic (31 January 1928 – 5 May 2008) was a Polish weightlifter. He competed in the men's bantamweight event at the 1952 Summer Olympics.

References

1928 births
2008 deaths
Polish male weightlifters
Olympic weightlifters of Poland
Weightlifters at the 1952 Summer Olympics
People from Żywiec County
20th-century Polish people
21st-century Polish people